Emery "Detroit Junior" Williams, Jr. (October 26, 1931 – August 9, 2005) was an American Chicago blues pianist, vocalist and songwriter. He is known for songs such as "So Unhappy", "Call My Job", "If I Hadn't Been High", "Ella" and "Money Tree". His songs have been covered by Koko Taylor, Albert King and other blues artists.

Career
Born in Haynes, Arkansas, Detroit recorded his first single, "Money Tree", with the Bea & Baby label in 1960. His first full album, Chicago Urban Blues, was released in the early 1970s on the Blues on Blues label. He also has recordings on Alligator, Blue Suit, The Sirens Records, and Delmark.

Detroit Junior began his career in Detroit, Michigan, backing touring musicians such as Eddie Boyd, John Lee Hooker, and Amos Milburn.  Boyd brought him to Chicago in 1956, where he spent the next twelve years.  In the early 1970s, Detroit toured and recorded with Howlin' Wolf.  After the death of Wolf in 1976, Detroit returned to Chicago, where he lived and performed until his death from heart failure in 2005. He was a weekly regular at Chicago blues clubs B.L.U.E.S. and Kingston Mines.

He was survived by his brother Kenneth H. Williams. Kenneth H. Williams is a songwriter, guitarist and noted audio engineer currently engineering for Erykah Badu, Donald Glover Jr. AKA Childish Gambino and many others.

Discography

Albums

References

External links
 Biographical information

1931 births
2005 deaths
American blues pianists
American male pianists
American blues singers
Songwriters from Arkansas
Singers from Arkansas
Chicago blues musicians
Electric blues musicians
Blues musicians from Arkansas
20th-century American singers
Songwriters from Illinois
20th-century American pianists
20th-century American male singers
American male songwriters